Jelena Dokić was the defending champion, but lost in the first round to Paola Suárez.

Anastasia Myskina won the title, defeating Alicia Molik in the final in straight sets.

Draw

Seeds

  Jelena Dokić (first round)
  Anastasia Myskina (champion)
  Patty Schnyder (first round)
  Ai Sugiyama (first round)
  Elena Dementieva (quarterfinals)
  Anna Pistolesi (second round)
  Nathalie Dechy (semifinals)
  Tatiana Panova (first round)

Finals

Top half

Bottom half

References

Sarasota Clay Court Classic - Singles
Tennis tournaments in Florida
Sarasota Clay Court Classic, Singles